Émile Proulx-Cloutier (born 1983) is a Canadian actor and musician. He is most noted for his performance in the film We Are the Others (Nous sommes les autres), for which he received a Canadian Screen Award nomination for Best Actor at the 6th Canadian Screen Awards.

His other roles have included the films Matusalem, The Ring, Le Banquet, Le déserteur, Another House (L'Autre maison), Remember Me (Mémorable moi), La Bolduc, Mont Foster and The Time Thief (L'Arracheuse de temps), and the television series Deux frères, Les Hauts et les bas de Sophie Paquin, 30 vies, Plan B and Sortez-moi de moi. As a musician he has released two albums, Aimer les monstres (2014) and Marée haute (2017).

Proulx-Cloutier has also directed short films. His film Life Begins (La Vie commence) was a shortlisted Genie Award nominee for Best Live Action Short Drama at the 30th Genie Awards.

As a musician, Proulx-Cloutier received a SOCAN Songwriting Prize nomination in 2018 for his song "Petite valise".

Personal life
Born in Montreal, Quebec, Proulx-Cloutier is the son of actors Raymond Cloutier and Danielle Proulx.

References

External links

1983 births
Living people
20th-century Canadian male actors
21st-century Canadian male actors
Canadian male film actors
Canadian male television actors
Film directors from Montreal
Canadian pop singers
French Quebecers
Male actors from Montreal
Singers from Montreal
Writers from Montreal
Canadian songwriters
French-language singers of Canada
21st-century Canadian male singers